Quell is an iOS and Android game developed by British studio Fallen Tree Games and released on August 7, 2010.

Gameplay
Players control a raindrop by swiping their finger in directions. The raindrop moves until it hits a wall. The raindrop must touch every golden ball without getting stuck or hitting spikes.

Additional puzzle elements such as switches, blocks, and gates introduce more complexity during gameplay.

Critical reception
The game has a Metacritic score of 84% based on 4 critic reviews.

NODpad Games said: "There is nothing to dislike about Quell; the game is the very embodiment of relaxation". AppSpy said "Quell is a beautifully relaxing puzzle title to delve in to and even when things get rough it's easy to get lost in the moment and just play for the sake of chilling out". Eurogamer wrote "At less than the price that airports charge for a packet of Extra, Quell is yet another way to make you feel Zen about spending hundreds of pounds on Apple hardware". SlideToPlay said "Quell is a simple puzzle game that you won't want to quit".

Sequels
Developer Fallen Tree Games later released multiple sequels:

Quell Reflect was announced and released on Aug 19, 2011 for iOS, and later on Android, Nintendo 3DS, and Steam.

Quell Memento was released in April 2013 for iOS, and later for Android, Nintendo 3DS, PS VITA, and Steam. This sequel introduced additional puzzle elements such as light panels, batteries, colored beams, roses, hidden timekeeper levels.

Quell Zen was announced and released in July 2016 for iOS, Android, and Steam. This sequel introduced additional puzzle elements such as matching symbol tiles, poisoned pearls, and hidden Zen and Black Hole levels.

References

2010 video games
Android (operating system) games
IOS games
Puzzle video games
Video games developed in the United Kingdom